A Nice Girl Like You is a 2020 American romantic comedy film directed by the Brothers Riedell (Chris and Nick Riedell), from a screenplay by Andrea Marcellus, based on the 2007 memoir Pornology by Ayn Carrillo Gailey. The film stars Lucy Hale and Leonidas Gulaptis.

The film was released video on demand on July 17, 2020, by Vertical Entertainment.

Plot
Lucy Neal disappoints her boyfriend Jeff, with her lack of intimacy. While he is asleep, Lucy looks at Jeff’s laptop and finds that he watches porn. They have an argument over this and they break up, with Jeff moving out of the apartment.

Lucy, with her string quartet, also comprising Nessa, Priscilla, and Paul, perform at a wedding, but she breaks down in the middle of it and tells them that Jeff left her because she won’t satisfy him. After some comforting and encouragement from the three, Lucy decides to make a sex list of things to improve her intimacy problems.

Lucy is at a wedding where she gets drunk and begins to yell by herself in frustration to not being able to use word cock in a sentence. She is overheard by a wedding guest, Grant. He comes in to comfort her and helps her get back outside after some friendly chatting.

Lucy starts off with her list by watching a lot of porn at home first and also reads a very racy novel. The next morning, Nessa and Priscilla come over to help Lucy get over Jeff, but she instead invites them to go to a sex store. Lucy meets Grant there. They chat some more and Lucy finds herself attracted to the man.

Same night, Lucy joins Paul at a strip club he visits regularly. She finds herself impressed by the dancing onstage, but when she sees that all she has is a $20 bill for a tip, Lucy awkwardly tries to take change from the dancer, which gets her and Paul kicked out.

Lucy attends an event with her group to perform. She meets Grant there and he asks Lucy to dance. Later, Grant asks her out to dinner which she accepts. 
Lucy goes on her dinner date with Grant, and they later attend a live taping for talk show host Dr. Becker since Priscilla gave Lucy tickets. Dr. Becker’s guest is sex expert Madame Swarovska, who brings Lucy up to speak with her. She senses the lack of sexual experience in her and basically encourages Grant to show her a good time.

She meets up with Grant again where they hook up and have good sex. In the morning, Grant is put off when he sees the amount of sexual paraphernalia in her room, along with pregnancy pants that Lucy bought purely for comfort. He ends up leaving, which Lucy sees. She is embarrassed and throws away all the sex stuff.

Lucy practices for her audition. She tries but doesn’t feel at her best. She later finds that Jeff is getting married and that he wants the group to perform at the wedding. Lucy agrees.

Lucy and Paul go to a bar. Lucy’s name is signed up for a talent show, and she plays the violin. Grant finds her and they reconcile and hook back up. Grant explains that earlier he freaked out because he thought Lucy was pregnant since he saw the pregnancy pants.

Lucy gets a message that she didn't get her spot with the Philharmonic, but she doesn’t care because she’s happy with Grant. At Jeff's wedding, Lucy hires Honey, a porn star, to show up, since she knows Jeff is a fan. He freaks out and worries that his new wife will see her, and he runs away. Honey then goes to dance with Paul. Lucy goes back to Grant so that she can try the last thing on the list with him.

Cast
 Lucy Hale as Lucy Neal   
 Leonidas Gulaptis as Grant Anderson
 Jackie Cruz as Nessa Jennings  
 Mindy Cohn as Pricilla Blum  
 Adhir Kalyan as Paul Goodwin 
 Stephen Friedrich as Jeff Thayer
 Leah McKendrick as Honey Parker
 Tori Piskin as Annie bride

Production
Principal photography on the film began on October 23 and ended on November 15, 2018.

Release
In June 2020, Vertical Entertainment acquired distribution rights to the film and set it for a July 17, 2020, release.

Reception
On Metacritic, the film has a score of 41% based on reviews from 5 critics, indicating "mixed or average reviews".

References

External links
 Official website
 

2020 films
2020 romantic comedy films
American independent films
American romantic comedy films
Films based on autobiographies
Vertical Entertainment films
Films scored by Aaron Zigman
Films set in New York City
Films set in the Las Vegas Valley
2020 independent films
2020s English-language films
2020s American films